Alan John Simpson (born 20 September 1948) is a British former Labour Party politician who was the Member of Parliament (MP) for Nottingham South from 1992 to 2010.

Early life
Simpson attended Bootle Grammar School for Boys and studied economics at Trent Polytechnic, where he was President of the Student Union from 1969–70. After graduating in 1972, he became a community worker, holding the post of Assistant General Secretary at the Nottingham Council of Voluntary Service from 1970–74, and working on an anti-vandalism project from 1974–78. He later became a research officer for the city's Racial Equality Council from 1979–92.

He joined the Labour Party in 1973 and was elected a county councillor in 1985. He first contested his eventual seat in 1987.

Parliamentary career 
Simpson is on the left-wing of the Labour Party. He was a member (and latterly treasurer) of the Socialist Campaign Group of MPs, as well as being on the board of the left-wing Tribune magazine. Simpson's opinions ran counter to those of the Labour frontbench: in the mid-1990s, he led the campaign to retain the original wording of Clause IV, and later established the "Labour Against the War" group, which opposes the Afghan war and occupation of Iraq.

On 31 October 2006, Simpson was among the 12 Labour MPs to back Plaid Cymru and the Scottish National Party's call for an inquiry into the Iraq War.

On 18 February 2007, Simpson announced his intention to stand down at the next general election. In a letter to his constituency party members, he felt his effectiveness would be greater outside parliament campaigning for radical environmental policy changes, rather than remaining on the back benches. Another factor behind his decision was the birth in 2006 of a baby daughter with his third wife.

Expenses controversy
Simpson was asked to pay back £500 that he was accused of over-claiming in cleaning bills by the auditor of MPs' expenses, Thomas Legg. Legg has been openly challenged by Simpson who refuses to return the money. Simpson threatened to take Legg to court over this matter.

Personal life
Simpson married Pascale Quiviger, a French-Canadian author and painter, in July 2005 at Newstead Abbey, the ancestral home of Lord Byron. They have a daughter born in January 2006. He has two sons and a daughter from a previous marriage.

Notes

External links 
 Guardian Politics – Alan Simpson see red over Big Power anti-green agenda
 TheyWorkForYou.com – Alan Simpson MP
 The Public Whip – Alan Simpson MP voting record
 BBC News – Alan Simpson profile 10 February 2005
 Interview with Alan Simpson about how we should make cities that do not steal from their children

Video clips 
 

1948 births
Living people
Labour Party (UK) MPs for English constituencies
People from Bootle
Alumni of Nottingham Trent University
UK MPs 1992–1997
UK MPs 1997–2001
UK MPs 2001–2005
UK MPs 2005–2010
European democratic socialists
Politicians from Liverpool